Serge Gakpé (born 7 May 1987) is a professional footballer who plays as a right winger. Born in France, he represents Togo at international level.

Club career
Gakpé began his career playing for his local club UMS Pontault-Combault, whom AS Monaco share a partnership with. During his time in Pontault-Combault, he regularly attended sessions at the Clairefontaine academy. After being recommended to the Ligue 1 side by Pontault-Combault and Clairefontaine officials, he agreed to join the principality-based side in 2001.

Despite not having a professional contract to his name, he joined the first-team squad following the winter break of the 2005–06 season making his professional debut in a 1–1 draw against RC Lens on 22 January 2006. Not only did he start the match, but he also scored his first professional goal in the 7th minute. He went on to play in 13 more matches and added another goal to his tally as well.

Serge then signed his first professional contract on 4 January 2007, inking a three-year deal with the club. He has since added another year to the contract, which ties him to Monaco until 2011. Over the next three seasons, his playing time dramatically increased making 76 appearances and scoring 11 goals. His performances have caught the attention of several prominent European clubs such as English sides Sheffield Wednesday, Chelsea and Tottenham Hotspur, and Spanish club Barcelona.

Gakpé signed for Ligue 2 club FC Nantes on 28 January 2011. At the end of January 2012, it was announced that Gakpé had signed for Belgian club Standard Liège on a season-long loan. On 30 August 2014, he scored the only goal in the match, in the form of a penalty against Montpellier HSC.

International career
Even though Gakpé was born in France, he chose to play for the Togo national team, and was called up for the 2010 FIFA World Cup qualification match against Morocco on 6 September 2009.

In 2013 he played in all matches at 2013 Africa Cup of Nations when his team reached the quarter-finals.

International goals
Scores and results list Togo's goal tally first, score column indicates score after each Gakpé goal.

References

External links

1987 births
Living people
Sportspeople from Bondy
French sportspeople of Togolese descent
Citizens of Togo through descent
Togolese footballers
French footballers
Association football wingers
Togo international footballers
France youth international footballers
France under-21 international footballers
Ligue 1 players
Ligue 2 players
Belgian Pro League players
Serie A players
AS Monaco FC players
FC Nantes players
Tours FC players
Standard Liège players
Genoa C.F.C. players
Atalanta B.C. players
A.C. ChievoVerona players
Amiens SC players
Cercle Brugge K.S.V. players
Togolese expatriate footballers
Apollon Limassol FC players
Karmiotissa FC players
2010 Africa Cup of Nations players
2013 Africa Cup of Nations players
2017 Africa Cup of Nations players
Expatriate footballers in Monaco
Expatriate footballers in France
Expatriate footballers in Belgium
Expatriate footballers in Italy
Expatriate footballers in Cyprus
Togolese expatriate sportspeople in France
Togolese expatriate sportspeople in Belgium
Togolese expatriate sportspeople in Italy
Togolese expatriate sportspeople in Cyprus
Footballers from Seine-Saint-Denis